Tropomyosin alpha-4 chain is a protein that in humans is encoded by the TPM4 gene.

References

Further reading